The Cayx Palace is a residence of the Danish Royal Family located in the wine district of Cahors in southern France.

In medieval times the castle formed part of the defences of the town of Luzech due to its dominance of the river Lot.

In the 15th century the chateau belonged to the Couderc family, who were notaries in Luzech, and in the 16th century the Courtois family held the lordship. With his marriage to Hélène de Courtois in 1640, Gerard Lefranc became lord of the domain. He was the first hereditary president of the Cours des Aides in nearby Cahors. His grandson, Jacques Lefrance, was president when the court was moved to Montauban in 1709, when he bought a property at Pompignan. Jacques' eldest son, the noted French poet Jean-Jacques Lefranc, Marquis de Pompignan spent the first half of his life at Cayx and received some of the inspiration for his garden at the Chateau de Pompignan from the siting and views (though not the architecture, by then outmoded) of Cayx. Jacques' second son, Jean-Georges, bishop of Vienne and also an Enlightenment figure was raised there as well. 
The sale of Cayx may have funded some of the building works at Pompignan, which itself was sold by Jean-Jacques' grandson in 1833.

The château was first fortified during the fourteenth century. Since then it has been rebuilt and renovated several times. The Lefrancs built the extensive wine cellars under the château. 

The phylloxera infestation devastated the vineyards during the late nineteenth century, and the owners emigrated to Indo-China. They did not return to Europe until 1955. In 1967 the family's heir, Henri Marie Jean André de Laborde de Monpezat, married Princess Margrethe, then heiress presumptive to the Danish throne, becoming Prince Consort of Denmark after she succeeded to Denmark's throne.

The royal couple purchased the château and the estate in 1974. Since then they have renovated it extensively. According to the official website of the Danish monarchy, the residence has become a "relaxed setting for reunions of the entire Danish Royal Family and their French relatives". It has been the setting for holiday photocalls for the Danish Royal Family, including for Prince Henrik's 80th birthday.

The residence is not open to the public. A guided tour of the gardens is available during the summer. The château still produces wine.

References

Cayx
Royal residences in France
Châteaux in Lot (department)
Danish monarchy